Bandar-e Moqam (also Romanized as Bandar-e Moqām, Bandar-e Moqām, and Bandar-e Maqām; also known as Bandar-e Margām, Bandar Muqām, Maqām, Moqām, and Muqām) is a village in Moqam Rural District, Shibkaveh District, Bandar Lengeh County, Hormozgan Province, Iran. At the 2006 census, its population was 1,537, in 296 families.

References 

Populated places in Bandar Lengeh County
Port cities and towns of the Persian Gulf